Paolo Bracchi (died 1497) was a Roman Catholic prelate who served as Bishop of Ariano (1481–1497).

Biography
In 1481, he was appointed Bishop of Ariano by Pope Sixtus IV.
He served as Bishop of Ariano until his death in 1497.

References

External links and additional sources
Eubel, Konrad (1914). Hierarchia catholica medii et recentioris aevi (in Latin). Vol. II (second ed.). Münster: Libreria Regensbergiana. p. 94.

15th-century Italian Roman Catholic bishops
Bishops appointed by Pope Sixtus IV
Bishops of Ariano
1497 deaths